Jonathan Creek is a British TV mystery series, named for the title character. 

It can also refer to:
Jonathan Creek Township, Moultrie County, Illinois 
Jonathan Creek (New Brunswick), a tributary of the Petitcodiac river, New Brunswick
Jonathan Creek (Ohio), a stream in Ohio
Jonathan Creek archaeological site, in Aurora, Kentucky